Guido v. List: Der Wiederentdecker Uralter Arischer Weisheit - Sein Leben und sein Schaffen is a book written by Johannes Balzli in 1917 on the Armanic occultist Guido von List.

The English translation of the title is Guido v. List - The Rediscoverer of Ancient Aryan Wisdom - His Life and His Work.

It was published while Theosophists acknowledged List's nationalist popularization of their doctrines, that was published in Vienna by the Guido-von-List-Gesellschaft in 1917.

It was republished later in the 20th century by Adolf Schleipfer.

This biography of List was the only book length biography of List.

During 1916 and 1917 List wrote several articles on the approaching national millennium, which was supposed to be realized once the Allies had been defeated, Balzli published 2 of these predictions in Prana in 1917.

See also
Guido von List
Adolf Schleipfer

References
The Occult Roots of Nazism by Nicholas Goodrick-Clarke, pp. 27, 45 and 47.
Flowers' introduction to The Secret of the Runes translated by Dr. Stephen E. Flowers Ph.D.

Notes

1917 non-fiction books
German books
Guido von List
Biographies (books)